This article show all participating team squads at the 2013 FIVB World Grand Prix, played by twelve countries with the final round held in Sapporo, Japan.

The following is the Algeria roster in the 2013 FIVB World Grand Prix.

The following is the Argentina roster in the 2013 FIVB World Grand Prix.

Head Coach: José Roberto Guimarães
The following is the Brazil roster in the 2013 FIVB World Grand Prix.

The following is the Bulgaria roster in the 2013 FIVB World Grand Prix.

Head Coach: Ping Lang
The following is the China roster in the 2013 FIVB World Grand Prix.

The following is the Cuba roster in the 2013 FIVB World Grand Prix.

The following is the Czech Republic roster in the 2013 FIVB World Grand Prix.

Head Coach: Marcos Kwiek.
The following is the Dominican Republic roster in the 2013 FIVB World Grand Prix.

The following is the Germany roster in the 2013 FIVB World Grand Prix.

The following is the Italy roster in the 2013 FIVB World Grand Prix.

Head Coach:
The following is the Japan roster in the 2013 FIVB World Grand Prix.

The following is the Kazakhstan roster in the 2013 FIVB World Grand Prix.

The following is the Netherlands roster in the 2013 FIVB World Grand Prix.

The following is the Poland roster in the 2013 FIVB World Grand Prix.
 Head coach: Piotr Makowski

The following is the Puerto Rico roster in the 2013 FIVB World Grand Prix.

The following is the Russia roster in the 2013 FIVB World Grand Prix.

The following is the Serbia roster in the 2013 FIVB World Grand Prix.

Head Coach: Kiattipong Radchatagriengkai
The following is the Thailand roster in the 2013 FIVB World Grand Prix.

The following is the Turkey roster in the 2013 FIVB World Grand Prix.

Head Coach: Karch Kiraly
The following is the United States roster in the 2013 FIVB World Grand Prix.

References

External links
FIVB

2013
2013 in volleyball